Asociación de Fútbol Calahorra is a Spanish women's football team based in Calahorra in the autonomous community of La Rioja. Founded in 2004, it plays in Liga Riojana de Fútbol Femenino. Its stadium is Campo de Fútbol La Planilla with a capacity of 4,000 seaters.

From 2011–12 season, it is the reserve team of CD Calahorra, changing its name to CD Calahorra B.

The men's section was disbanded in June 2012, when that was acquired by CD Calahorra, keeping the women's section.

Season to season (men's)

3 season in Tercera División

References

External links
frfutbol.com profile
Futbolme.com profile  

Football clubs in La Rioja (Spain)
Women's football clubs in Spain
Association football clubs established in 2004
2004 establishments in Spain